Steinernema riobrave is a species of nematodes belonging to the family Steinernematidae.

The species is found in United States. They are an entomopathogenic nematode of termites.

References

Rhabditida
Nematodes described in 1994
Invertebrates of the United States
Parasitic nematodes of animals